The Serious Crime Act 2015 is an Act of the Parliament of the United Kingdom. Introduced in June 2014 as part of the Queen's Speech opening the 2014-15 session of Parliament, the Bill was sponsored by the Home Office. It was passed by Parliament on 2 March 2015, and received royal assent on 3 March 2015.

The Bill proceeding the Act proposed a 'Cinderella Law' to outlaw causing emotional distress of children, regulate corrupt accountants and other businesses who assist criminal gangs, regulate 'drug cutting agents', and deal with offences related to female genital mutilation, paedophilia, and amend the Terrorism Act 2006.

Part 1: Proceeds of Crime

This part amends the Proceeds of Crime Act 2002 in determining the extent of a defendant's interest in confiscated property, and amends the procedures surrounding costs and court sentencing. This includes amending, defining, or creating regulations on the extent of a defendant's interest in proceeds of crime, the provision of information by third parties, the time-frame and manner of payment, absconding defendants, and connected purposes.

Part 2: Computer Misuse

This part amends the Computer Misuse Act 1990 in relation to hacking, creating viruses or Trojan Horses, the deliberate act of creating serious risk to computers or computer systems and amends the territorial extent of computer crimes. This includes a new offence of impairing a computer to cause damage, with a 14 years' prison sentence for damage to the economy or environment, in addition to ensuring the United Kingdom adopts the EU Directive 2013/40/EU on attacks against information systems.

Part 3: Organised, Serious and Gang-related Crime

This part adopts the ratified UN Convention against Transnational Organised Crime. The new 'participation offence' would encompass not just those who carry out an act of serious crime, but those who provide materials, services or related infrastructure. The Bill would extend elements of the Serious Crime Act 2007 to Scotland, and extends the making of a Serious Crime Prevention Order to include firearms offences and the cultivation of cannabis plants.

Part 4: Seizure and Forfeiture of Drug-cutting Agents

This part creates and extends the power of search and seizure warrants related to the investigation into the creation or ownership of substances used when 'cutting' drugs.

Part 5: Protection of Children, etc.

This part extends the definition of child cruelty to incorporate abuse, neglect or psychological damage, and amends existing legislation relating to paedophile material to include publications that advise on how to commit or facilitate sexual offences against children. It also prohibits intentional communication of a sexual nature with a minor (including encouraging the minor to communicate anything of a sexual nature) for the purpose of obtaining sexual gratification. Existing legislation on female genital mutilation is also amended by this part. This Part amends the Children and Young Persons Act 1933, making it explicit that suffering of a child can be physical or psychological, and amends the offence of suffocating a child under three. Finally, this part creates the offence of "controlling or coercive behaviour in an intimate or family relationship".

Part 6: Miscellaneous and General

This part deals with the preparation or training abroad for terrorist related activities, amendments related to the Treaty on the Functioning of the European Union in relation to serious crime, and consequential amendments. The unauthorised possession of a bladed instrument within a prison is made an explicit offence by this Part, amending the Prison Act 1952 to include prisons, secure training centres and young offender institutions.

References

External links
 Serious Crime Act 2015
 Explanatory notes on the Serious Crime Act 2015

Civil rights and liberties in the United Kingdom
United Kingdom Acts of Parliament 2015